Maltschacher See is a lake in Carinthia, Austria, 5 kilometers south-east of Feldkirchen in Kärnten. A swamp is located on the western side of the lake. The outflow from the lake feeds the Strußnigteich, a breeding ground where carps are grown, four kilometers southeast of the Maltschacher See.

Flora and fauna
The lake originally had a dense belt of reeds and aquatic plants. In 1975 the grass carp was introduced in the lake which destroyed both plants and reed belts. Since 1991, the grass carp is no longer observed. Fifteen fish species are presently living in the lake. The main species found are perch, bream, bleak, carp, tench and perch.

Tourism
At the shore of the Maltschacher See is a campsite, a bungalow park and restaurants. In the vicinity are another campground and several guesthouses.

References

External links
 Kärntner Institut für Seenforschung

Lakes of Carinthia (state)